Philip James Flood  (born 2 July 1935) is a distinguished former Australian diplomat and a former senior public servant. The highlights of Flood's career include Secretary of the Department of Foreign Affairs and Trade and former High Commissioner to the United Kingdom. He was also Ambassador to Indonesia, Director-General of the Australian Agency for International Development, Director-General of the Office of National Assessments, and Head of the Inquiry into the Australian Intelligence Community (known as the Flood Report).

Since his retirement from the public service in 2000, Flood has been actively involved with CARE Australia, the Australia-Indonesia Institute and Asialink; and has headed several public inquiries, the most recent being the Inquiry into Plasma Fractionation, the Inquiry into Australia's Intelligence Agencies and the Inquiry into Detention Centres.

Public service career

Flood attended the University of Sydney, obtaining a Bachelor of Economics (Hons) degree, before joining the Department of External Affairs in 1958. Flood rose quickly through the diplomatic ranks at the department, serving at the Australian mission to the European Economic Community in Brussels.  He returned to Australia and served as Executive Assistant to the then Secretary of External Affairs, Sir Arthur Tange.  He then was posted to the Australian Embassy in Paris and Delegation to the Organisation for Economic Co-operation and Development, where he was Counsellor. He then served as Australia's High Commissioner to Bangladesh.

Appointed to the Australian Embassy in the United States in 1976, Flood served as Minister and Deputy Head of Mission and subsequently appointed to the post of Chief Executive for Special Trade Negotiations. In 1985 he was appointed Deputy Secretary of the Department of Foreign Affairs and Trade. In 1989, Flood was appointed Australia's Ambassador to Indonesia; serving until 1993. Upon his return to Australia, Flood became Director General of AIDAB (renamed AusAID), the Australian development cooperation agency.  In 1995, Flood was appointed Director General of the Australian Office of National Assessments.

In 1996, Flood was appointed Secretary of the Department of Foreign Affairs and Trade; until his appointment in 1998 as Australian High Commissioner to the United Kingdom; and his retirement from the diplomatic service in 2000.

Career after public service

Appointed a Director of the Australia Indonesia Institute in 2000, the following year Flood was appointed by Alexander Downer as Chairman of the institute, where he served until 2004. Flood served as Deputy Chair CARE Australia 2007–2012, Board member from 2003; Deputy Chair Asialink 2005–2009, Board member from 2004; member of Foreign Affairs Council 2004–2007; and National President of the Order of Australia Association 2016–2019.

Flood headed the Inquiry into Immigration Detention Centres which reported to the Australian Government in February 2001; the report condemned the then detention centre at Woomera, and especially its treatment of children. He also headed the Inquiry into Australian Intelligence Agencies, which reported in July 2004; and the Inquiry into Plasma Fractionation, which reported in December 2006. The Inquiry into Australian Intelligence Agencies was the major report into the failure of intelligence on the Iraq War.

Honours
In 1992, Flood was appointed an Officer of the Order of Australia in recognition of his service to international relations. He was given the Indonesian Order of Merit, called the Bintang Jasa Utama, for services to the development of relations between Australia and Indonesia. In 2001 Flood was granted the Centenary Medal for his significant contribution over many years to international relations.

Published works

References

External links
Edited extracts from Dancing with warriors: a diplomatic memoir

1935 births
Living people
Recipients of the Centenary Medal
High Commissioners of Australia to the United Kingdom
Permanent Representatives of Australia to the International Maritime Organization
Ambassadors of Australia to Indonesia
High Commissioners of Australia to Bangladesh
People educated at North Sydney Boys High School
Officers of the Order of Australia